Autódromo Viedma is a  motorsports circuit located in Viedma, Argentina. It was inaugurated on April 25, 2004.

The circuit has several layouts, which allow the organization of national series events. Turismo Carretera (since 2015), Super TC 2000 and Turismo Nacional races are held on this circuit.

Lap records 

The official race lap records at the Autódromo Ciudad de Viedma are listed as:

References

Autódromo Ciudad de Viedma
Autódromo Ciudad de Viedma